The 1950 All-Eastern football team consists of American football players chosen by various selectors as the best players at each position among the Eastern colleges and universities during the 1950 college football season.

All-Eastern selections

Backs
 Reds Bagnell, Penn
 Dick Kazmaier, Princeton
 Al Pollard, Army
 Richard Doyne, Lehigh

Ends
 Dan Foldberg, Army
 Alan Pfeiffer, Fordham

Tackles
 Holland Donan, Princeton
 Paul Teteault, Navy

Guards
 Bernie Lemonick, Penn
 John Pierik, Cornell

Centers
 Elmer Stout, Army

Key
 AP = Associated Press

See also
 1950 College Football All-America Team

References

All-Eastern
All-Eastern college football teams